Vladimir Marković alias LoOney (born December 4, 1980) is a Serbian singer-songwriter, actor, filmmaker and comic artist. He rose to prominence as a child actor and is known for playing Zlatko in TV series "Metla Bez Drške", one of the most popular Serbian children's television series. 

In the beginnings of 2000's he adopted LoOney as his artistic alias and started creating underground comics with Šlic Comix group, and had several exhibitions and a lot of publications with them.

LoOney was the first Serbian RnB singer, and had great success with solo single "Jutro (Pametnije Od Noći)" which led to hit singles "Tajne" (from Struka's album "Ipak Se Obrće"), "Geto Riba" and "Sekund, Minut, Sat" (both on Lud's album "U Ime Igre"). He has one album, "Kompromis", which was initially published trough MTV Adria.

After finishing Faculty of Dramatic Arts, University of Arts in Belgrade, he has successful career working for film, TV and web.

Career 

He began his career as Zlatko, the main character of "Metla Bez Drške", a Serbian children's television series. He also sang in the children's choir Kolibri, and appeared with the group in several TV shows, including "Deco Pevajte Sa Nama", "Ispeci Pa Reci", "Sedefna Ruža" and others.

As a teenager, he discontinued acting and singing and became an underground comic artist with dozens of other artists' and self-published fanzines. Marković started using his alias "LoOney: in 1999 as art-name. In 2002, with a group of friends, he created and managed "Šlic Comix", an alternative comics magazine and weekly workshop. Some comics were re-published internationally, and exhibitions traveled around Serbia, Croatia, Bosnia, Macedonia, Slovenia, Romania, Italy, and Sweden. Marković later stopped drawing, but wrote for other artists.
In 2002, he started directing and editing hip-hop music videos. Six years later, he became a filmmaker in Serbia. Marković directed TV shows "Hoću Da Znaš", "Siti i Vitki","X-Factor Adria" and edited TV shows "Zvezda Pre Svega", "Exit Kultomotivator", "Exit U Pokretu" and "Ja Imam Talenat!".

In 2004, Marković self-published his first solo single "Jutro (Pametnije Od Noći)" with accompanying music video which got #2 place on, at that point, only domestic music video chart in Serbia on TV Metropolis. Marković was featured on other artists' albums and singles, including Struka's "Tajne", Lud's "Geto Riba" with accompanying music video featuring stars of a movie "Mi Nismo Anđeli 2."

In 2010, Marković released a mixtape "Featuring! Vol. 1". Soon after that, Marković published a single "Mucam" with two remixes created by Serbian DJs, SevdahBaby and Flip. SevdahBaby, amongst other celebrities, appears in "Mucam" music video, again directed by LoOney himself. Debut album "Kompromis", rare Serbian urban and RnB effort, finally saw the light of day in 2011 in digital form through MTV Adria Network websites. In that way, album became accessible to the whole Adriatic region.
His latest single "(Hoću S Tobom Da) Đuskam / (I Wanna) Dance With You" was released in September 2013.

Discography

Solo albums 

2011: Kompromis

Solo mixtapes 

2010: Featuring! Vol. 1

Solo singles 

2004: "Jutro (Pametnije Od Noći)"
2010: "Mucam"
2013: "(Hoću S Tobom Da) Đuskam + (I Wanna) Dance With You"

Albums as a featured artist 

 1990: Kolibri - Koncert
 1998: Kolibri - Kolibri
 2004: Struka - Ipak Se Obrće
 2005: Suid - Drama Koja Se Šunja Sama
 2005: Various Artists - Definicija
 2005: Various Artists - Hip-Hop Hits Vol. 1
 2005: Various Artists - Mi Nismo Anđeli 2 (Muzika Iz Filma)
 2005: Grupna Terapija - Ko te Šalje?
 2006: Lud - U Ime igre
 2006: Sett - Dnevnik Dvorske Lude
 2006: Gospoda - Realno Gledano
 2007: Shwartzenigga - Beograd Vietnam
 2008: Grupna Terapija - Ko Te Šalje?
 2008: Sin - Kosovo Vijetnam
 2008: Big Sha - Bread and Amphetamines
 2009: Dada - Radio Ubica Dečjeg Lica
 2009: Sett - Vodič Kroz Život Za Bezbrižne
 2009: Cvija - I Dalje Tu
 2010: Mija - Van Kontrole
 2011: B-Crew - Naša Posla
 2015: Fil Tilen - Predstava Počinje

Singles as a featured artist 

 2004: Struka ft. LoOney - "Tajne"
 2005: Lud ft. LoOney - "Geto Riba"
 2006: Lud ft. VIP, Struka, Borko THC & LoOney - "Sekund, Minut, Sat"
 2011: Kantare ft. Tatula & LoOney - "Kad Bi Bila Sa Mnom"
 2011: Papi Jaaz & Da Daz ft. LoOney - "Ona Zna"
 2016: Kendi ft. LoOney - "Nostalgija"

Singles as a songwriter 

 2011: Trik FX - "Kokoška" (with Marko Kon & Drilla)
 2013: Kristina Grujin - "Idemo U Disko" (with Ognjen Amidžić, Marko Kon & Drilla)
 2013: Sindy - "Telo Gori" (with Marko Kon & Drilla)
 2013: Željko & Lubee Game - "Encore" (with Marko Kon, Lubee Game & Drilla)
 2019: Klikbejt - "Klikbejt" (with Papi Jaaz & Grzi)
 2019: Klikbejt - "Drama" (with Papi Jaaz & Grzi)

Videography

As a director 

 2004: "Kuća Na Promaji" for Marčelo
 2004: "Jutro (Pametnije Od Noći)" for LoOney (himself)
 2006: "Sekund, Minut, Sat" for Lud, VIP, Struka, Borko THC & LoOney (himself)
 2009: "Živi Bili Pa Videli" for Željko Samardžić
 2009: "Moja Želja Si Ti" for Cvija
 2009: "Balkan" for Priki
 2009: "Požuri" for Ksenija Pajčin & MC Stojan
 2009: "Tajni Susreti" for Noć i Dan
 2010: "Supica" for Ksenija Pajčin & Danijel Alibabić
 2010: "Đinđirinđi 100%" for Blek Panters
 2010: "Sexy" for Tina Ivanović & MC Stojan
 2010: "Ljubav (Live at Kalemegdan)" for LoOney (himself)
 2010: "Ovako Je U Švici" for Komplex & Eky
 2010: "Diskoteka" for Cvija & DJ Shone
 2010: "Mucam" for LoOney (himself)
 2010: "DJ Pumpaj" for MC Stojan & Anabela
 2011: "Nikom Nije Lako" for Saška Janković (Miss Jukebox)
 2012: "Klik, Blic, Smešak" for Dada & Marvel
 2012: "You & Me" for DJ Macro / Syntheticsax / Kantare
 2012: "Zaustavite Januar" for Željko Samardžić
 2013: "Jadna Ja" Zlatopis & Macka B
 2013: "Encore" for Željko & Lubee Game
 2013: "Ajde Vodi Me" for Rastko Aksentijević & MC Sajsi
 2014: "Pakao i Raj" for DJ Mlađa & Sha
 2014: "Open Your Heart" for Yoya Wolf
 2014: "Kišno Leto" for Stevan Anđelković & Tanja Savić
 2015: "Sudar" for Euterpa
 2015: "Žena" for Marina Visković
 2015: "Letnje Avanture" for Snežana Nena Nešić
 2016: "Moje Vreme Je Sad" for Dada & Plema
 2018: "Kraljevi Falša" for Mr. Sharan
 2019: "Klikbejt" for Klikbejt
 2019: "Drama" for Klikbejt
 2019: "Samo Da Mi Je" for Lena Kovačević
 2020: "Kao Da Sam Luda" for Milena Munja Stojanović

References

External links 
 LoOney's official About.me
 Looneyrama youtube channel
 Looneyrama Music youtube channel
 Discogs LoOney's Discogs
 

1980 births
Living people